Jonathan Zino Bamba (born 26 March 1996) is a professional footballer who plays as a left winger for Ligue 1 club Lille. Born in France, Bamba represented the country at various youth international levels, before switching his allegiance to Ivory Coast at senior level.

Club career

Saint Étienne
Bamba is a graduate of the Saint Étienne youth academy, which he joined in 2011.

Bamba made his Ligue 1 debut on 25 January 2015 against Paris Saint-Germain replacing Yohan Mollo after 82 minutes in a 0–1 home defeat. During the summer of 2015 he scored against Ajax Amsterdam in a pre-season friendly. On 20 September 2015, he started in the Ligue 1 match against Nantes and scored in the 26th minute to register his first competitive goal for Saint-Étienne's first team in a 2–0 home win.

On 18 January 2016, Bamba joined Ligue 2 club Paris FC on loan until the end of the 2015-16 season, with Paris FC not given an option to buy him when the loan expired. Bamba was loaned to Belgian First Division A club Sint-Truiden in the summer of 2016.  However Sint-Truiden sent him back early to Saint-Etienne during the winter break of the 2016–17 season. On 4 January 2017, Bamba was loaned to Ligue 1 club Angers until the end of the 2016-17 season.

On 24 September 2017, Bamba scored Saint-Étienne's second equalizing goal from the penalty spot in a 2–2 Ligue 1 home draw against Rennes to register his fourth Ligue 1 goal (three of which were penalties) of the 2017–18 season.

Lille

On 2 July 2018, Bamba signed a five year deal with Lille OSC. On 11 August 2018, Bamba made his competitive debut for Lille and scored the final goal of the match in the 3–1 Ligue 1 home win over Stade Rennais. Two weeks later, he played his third Ligue 1 match for Lille and took his 2018–19 Ligue 1 goal tally to three when he scored two goals in the 3–0 Ligue 1 home win over Guingamp. On 30 September, Bamba scored two goals (including a penalty) in the final six minutes of the match in the 3–0 Ligue 1 home win over Marseille. On 6 October, he took his 2018–19 Ligue 1 goal tally to seven (he had scored only seven Ligue 1 goals during the entire 2017–18 season) when he scored two goals again and assisted Nicolas Pépé's goal in a 3–1 Ligue 1 home win over Saint-Étienne.

After a cancelled 2019–20 Ligue 1 season because of the COVID-19 pandemic, Bamba became confirmed as a regular starter, as Lille won their fourth league title during the 2020–21 season, being in the field in all league games.

During the 2021–22 Lille OSC season, he participated in the 1–0 win against PSG in the Trophée des Champions, with the club winning that trophy for the first time ever. Later, he helped the team to get out of the 2021–22 UEFA Champions League group stage and played against Chelsea in round of 16.

International career 
Thanks to his origins, Bamba could choose to represent either France or Ivory Coast internationally.

After representing the former country at various youth levels, he switched his allegiance to the latter in March 2023, as he accepted a call-up to the Ivorian senior national team for two Africa Cup of Nations qualification matches against Comoros.

Personal life 
Bamba is of Ivorian descent.

Career statistics

Honours

Club
Lille
Ligue 1: 2020–21
Trophée des Champions: 2021

Individual
UNFP Ligue 1 Player of the Month: April 2019, October 2020

References

External links
 
 

1996 births
Living people
Association football midfielders
French footballers
France under-21 international footballers
France youth international footballers
French sportspeople of Ivorian descent
Black French sportspeople
French expatriate footballers
Expatriate footballers in Belgium
AS Saint-Étienne players
Paris FC players
Sint-Truidense V.V. players
Angers SCO players
Lille OSC players
Ligue 1 players
Ligue 2 players
Belgian Pro League players
People from Alfortville
Footballers from Val-de-Marne